Association football is the most popular sport in Russia, beating ice hockey by a huge margin. Men's football is overseen by the Russian Football Union, having the Russian Premier League as the first tier of the Russian football league system, with the Russian Football National League being the second tier.

On 28 February 2022, due to the 2022 Russian invasion of Ukraine and in accordance with a recommendation by the International Olympic Committee (IOC), FIFA and UEFA suspended the participation of Russia, including in the Qatar 2022 World Cup. The Russian Football Union unsuccessfully appealed the FIFA and UEFA bans to the Court of Arbitration for Sport, which upheld the bans.

Following the break up of the USSR
With the USSR collapsing in 1991, Russia emerged as its successor state, with the Soviet football federation being transformed in the Russian football federation. While the national teams and the clubs used to be linked to state institutions or mass organizations, in 1991 some of them became private enterprises. Just like in many other spheres of business, corrupt and sometimes bloody division of power began. Furthermore, many teams of the erstwhile Soviet Top League, were now divided between the national football associations of the newly independent republics. Many of the top brand names lost their financing from the government and were left to rot, waiting for some forms of sponsorship. Citizens of Russia are interested mostly in the national team that gets to compete in the World Cup and the European Championship, and in the Premier league, where clubs from different cities look to become champions of Russia. There are also competitions considered less important, such as the Russian Cup. Some of the most successful clubs include Spartak Moscow, Lokomotiv Moscow, CSKA Moscow, Zenit St. Petersburg, Dynamo Moscow and FC Torpedo Moscow.

Today, football is the most popular in Russia, beating hockey. A very high proportion of men are interested in it to a certain extent (and many children play it regularly) and women also join men when it comes to the national team. The Russian league is rapidly regaining its former strength because of huge sponsorship deals, an influx of finances and a fairly high degree of competitiveness with roughly 5 teams capable of winning the title. Russian top teams are usually sponsored by state-controlled companies. For example, Gazprom sponsors Zenit Saint Petersburg, Lukoil sponsors FC Spartak Moscow, Russian Railways sponsors FC Lokomotiv Moscow etc.  Many notable talented foreign players have been and are playing in the Russian league as well as local talented players worthy of a spot in the starting eleven of the best clubs. Foreign players sometimes face a very hostile environment. A problem of racism in Russian football is particularly important.

The Russian national team gained attention when they defeated traditional European powerhouse Netherlands 3-1 in the Euro 2008 quarterfinals before losing to eventual champions Spain. Nevertheless, four players made the Team of the Tournament. Some players such as Andrei Arshavin and Roman Pavlyuchenko earned big-money moves to the English Premier League after impressing at the tournament. Currently, the majority of Russian footballers play in a home league mainly due to the foreign players limits. This causes a significant disbalance in players' salaries with Russian footballers getting more than their foreign counterparts only because of their nationality.

Thus as of 2010 the Russian Premier League was among the best in Eastern Europe, as evidenced by recent victories in the UEFA Cup (CSKA Moscow defeated Sporting CP in the 2005 final and Zenit St. Petersburg earned a victory over Rangers F.C. in the 2008 UEFA Cup in Manchester and also claimed the UEFA Super Cup in a 2-1 win over Manchester United.)

On 28 February 2022, due to the 2022 Russian invasion of Ukraine and in accordance with a recommendation by the International Olympic Committee (IOC), FIFA and UEFA suspended the participation of Russia, including in the Qatar 2022 World Cup. The Russian Football Union unsuccessfully appealed the FIFA and UEFA bans to the Court of Arbitration for Sport, which upheld the bans.

League system
The first level of the Russian league system is the 16-club Premier League. Below are two other professional levels, namely First League and Second League, both managed by the National Football League. The First League consists of 18 clubs, and the Second League has 72 clubs split geographically into Groups 1 to 4 (representing Southern, Western, Central and Eastern parts of Russia) with varying numbers of clubs. Four clubs from the Far East are allocated to Groups 2 to 4. After each season, the top two clubs of the First League replace the bottom two clubs of the Premier League, and champions of each Second League group replace the four bottom clubs of the First League.

The Second Division is the lowest level of professional football in Russia. The next level of football is the Amateur Football League (aka Third Division), which is split into ten zones: North-West (Severo-Zapad), Golden Ring (Zolotoe Koltso), Moscow City (Gorod Moskva), Moscow Region (Podmoskovye), Center, South (Yug), Volga Region (Privolzhye), Ural and West Siberia (Ural i Zapadnaya Sibir), Siberia (Sibir), and Far East (Dalniy Vostok). Also there is a Cup competition in each zone. At the end of the season, the zonal champions and cup winners participate in the AFL Finals to determine the AFL Champions and Cup Winners. There is no automatical promotion/relegation between Second League and AFL, though the winners of each Amateur Football League zone are eligible for promotion to the Second League, provided that they have taken part in the AFL Finals. The actual promotion and relegation is subject to meeting Professional Football League requirements.

There is no promotion/relegation between the AFL and lower level either, and the composition of AFL zones can change a lot from season to season, as the AFL is basically open to new clubs. At the lower Level, there are championships of federal subjects. They are often called the Fourth Division, though these competitions are formally not part of the league system. Nevertheless, some AFL zonal football unions organize tournaments (like Champions League) for the champions of federal subjects which are the members of the respective union. Many federal subject leagues provide a much stronger competition, so clubs often prefer to stay at the 5th level rather than enter the AFL.
The competitions at the 4th and 5th level have a spring-autumn format, unlike the autumn-spring professional league format.

National team

The national teams prior were the Soviet Union national football team, which was a football world power, and the transitional CIS national football team, which took part in the Euro 1992. Since the collapse of Soviet Union the Russia national team has had success in Euro 2008 before it took ten years to repeat this feat, this time as host of the 2018 FIFA World Cup. Russian team was eliminated in the group stage of the 1994 World Cup, 2002 World Cup, 2010 World Cup, Euro 1992 (as CIS), Euro 2004, Euro 2012 and Euro 2016. Russia didn't qualify for the major tournaments on four occasions: in 1996, 2000, 2006 and 2010. Russian team is currently ranked 41st in the Fifa World Rankings.

Hosting the World Cup
On December 2, 2010, Russia was awarded the 2018 FIFA World Cup. Russia hosted the tournament for the first time, becoming the largest country to host the World Cup, a title held by the United States since 1994.

Cup competitions
The main cup competition in Russia is the Russian Cup. Only professional clubs take part in it.

There is also an Amateur Football League Cup, a competition for the Amateur Football League clubs. The winners of this cup are eligible for promotion to the Second Division. Cups of federal subjects are also played.

European competitions
The Russian League was in 2013 regarded as the 6th strongest league in Europe, based on the UEFA coefficient.
Russian club sides constantly compete in the UEFA Champions League and Europa League. Over the last years Russian clubs have won three major European trophies. These are 2004–05 UEFA Cup won by CSKA Moscow, 2007–08 UEFA Cup and 2008 UEFA Super Cup won by Zenit St. Petersburg.

Women's football
Women's football is not as popular in Russia as men's football, although it has increased in popularity in the 2000s.

+40,000-capacity Russian football stadiums

See also
 Football in Crimea
 Sport in Russia
 List of football stadiums in Russia
 Russian national football team

References

 
Sport in Russia by sport